The Ulungur River / Urungu River or Urungu, in its upper reaches in Mongolia known as the Bulgan River, is a river of China and Mongolia.  It rises in the Altai Mountains in western Mongolia, flows south into China's Xinjiang (Altay Prefecture), where it turns north-west to empty into the Ulungur Lake.  It is about 700 km long.

Geological history
In the early Quaternary, the Ulungur (as well as the upper Irtysh) flowed into the Dzungarian Basin, terminating in a large lake (the "Old Manas Lake") in the region of today's Lake Manas. Later tectonic movements redirected the Ulungur onto its current course.

Wildlife
The Sino-Mongolian beaver, Castor fiber birulai, is found only in the basin of the Ulungur River. The population is considered endangered. The Bulgan Beaver Nature Reserve has been established on the Bulgan River (a tributary of the Ulungur River) in Qinggil (Qinghe) County in 1980 to protect the creatures.

Notes

Links 

 The river Bulgan Gol

Rivers of Xinjiang
Rivers of Mongolia